Walther Benser (23 October 1912 – 21 April 2002) was a photographer, photo journalist and merchant from Germany. He traveled as a freelance photographer with a Leica camera, gave slide lecture tours and established the stock photo agency ZEFA. In 1989 he gave a presentation "Sixty Years with the Leka (sic) at the Leica Historical Society of America meeting in Philadelphia.

He was married to painter Ursula Benser (née Heuser), daughter of painter Werner Heuser.

Bibliography
Walther Benser (1957). Wir photographieren farbig. Europäischer Buchklub.

References

External links 

 Walther Benser on Good Reads

20th-century German photographers
1912 births
2002 deaths
Leica Camera